The 2019 European Modern Pentathlon Championships was held in Bath, Great Britain from 6 to 11 August 2019. The event was to be the 27th edition of the competition, and the third held in Great Britain.

The event was a direct qualification event for the 2020 Summer Olympics, with the eight highest finishers in the men's and women's individual events gaining quota places for their National Olympic Committee at the 2020 Games.

Medal summary

Men's events

Women's events

Mixed events

Medal table

Olympic Qualifiers

The following pentathletes secured qualification for the 2020 Olympic Games:

References

External links
Official website 

2019
2019 in modern pentathlon
2019 in British sport
Modern pentathlon
August 2019 sports events in the United Kingdom
Modern pentathlon competitions in the United Kingdom
International sports competitions hosted by the University of Bath